Thomas Greer (4 April 1837 – 20 September 1905) was an Irish Conservative politician. He was the Member of Parliament (MP) for Carrickfergus from 1880 to 1885.

References

External links
 

1837 births
1905 deaths
UK MPs 1880–1885
Members of the Parliament of the United Kingdom for County Antrim constituencies (1801–1922)